Sir Arthur Pugh (19 January 1870 – 2 August 1955) was a British trade unionist.

Born in Ross-on-Wye, Pugh was apprenticed to a farmer who also worked as a butcher, but soon moved to Neath to work in the steel industry, where he became active in the British Steel Smelters' Association.  In 1901, he moved to Frodingham, Lincolnshire, and he became first Assistant Secretary and then Office Secretary of the union.  In 1917, he played a leading role in the formation of the Iron and Steel Trades Confederation (ISTC) and the British Iron, Steel and Kindred Trades Association, becoming the first General Secretary of the ISTC.  He served as President of the Trades Union Congress in 1926, during the UK General Strike, was on the economic consultative committee of the League of Nations, and was active in running the Daily Herald newspaper.  He retired from his union posts in 1935, receiving a knighthood, and wrote Men of Steel, a history of the metal-workers trade unions.

References

1870 births
1955 deaths
General Secretaries of the Iron and Steel Trades Confederation
Knights Bachelor
Members of the General Council of the Trades Union Congress
Members of the Parliamentary Committee of the Trades Union Congress
People from Ross-on-Wye
Presidents of the Trades Union Congress
Trade unionists from Herefordshire